Karnsophis is a genus of snakes belonging to the family Homalopsidae.

Species
Species:
 Karnsophis siantaris Murphy & Voris, 2013

References

Homalopsidae
Snake genera